Lights of New York is a 1916 American silent drama film directed by Van Dyke Brooke. Produced by the Vitagraph Company of America and directed by Van Dyke Brooke, the film stars Walter McGrail and Leah Baird. Its status is currently unknown.

Plot 
Hoping to improve his financial lot, petty thief Hawk Chovinski (McGrail) hires a dancing instructor to teach him how to bear himself like a gentleman. His lessons completed, Hawk then poses as a European nobleman, intending to trap a wealthy wife. Yolande Cowles (Baird) sees through Hawk's pose but falls in love with him anyway.

Cast
 Leah Baird as Yolande Cowles
 Walter McGrail as Hawk Chovinski
 Arthur Cozine as Skelly
 Adele DeGarde as Poppy Brown
 Leila Blow as Mrs. Cowles
 Agnes Wadleigh as Mrs. Cropsey
 Donald Cameron as Martin Drake (as Don Cameron)
 Edwina Robbins as Mrs. Blossom
 John Costello

References

External links
 
 

1916 films
American black-and-white films
American silent feature films
Films set in New York City
1916 drama films
Silent American drama films
Vitagraph Studios films
Films directed by Van Dyke Brooke
1910s American films